Phyllostachys tianmuensis  is a species of bamboo found in Anhui, Zhejiang provinces of China

References

External links
 
 

tianmuensis
Flora of China